Epic Mickey 2: The Power of Two is a 2012 platform video game developed by Junction Point Studios and published by Disney Interactive Studios, and is the sequel to Epic Mickey. The game was first released on the PlayStation 3, Wii, Wii U, and Xbox 360 in November 2012, and would make further releases on the PlayStation Vita, and Microsoft Windows over the next two years. The game features an optional co-op mode where a second player plays as Oswald and assist the first player, Mickey, in saving the Wasteland. The game also has a companion called Epic Mickey: Power of Illusion for the Nintendo 3DS.

Plot
All has been well in Wasteland since Mickey Mouse saved it from destruction by the Shadow Blot, with the world's inhabitants beginning its restoration, but a series of earthquakes have been occurring lately. The Mad Doctor, who survived his previous defeat and mostly communicates by singing, arrives and asks Oswald to join forces with him in order to save Wasteland. Not trusting the Mad Doctor, Gus, the leader of the Gremlins, and Ortensia, Oswald's wife, contact Mickey, who enters Yen Sid's workshop once more and takes the magic paintbrush to aid him as he enters Wasteland. Oswald joins up with them in Dark Beauty Castle, explaining the Mad Doctor warned him of the Blotworx - Blotlings piloting Beetleworx-like machines. The castle begins collapsing from an earthquake, forcing them to escape; Oswald retrieves his powerful remote en route.

Mickey and Oswald arrive in Mean Street, which has been split in half by the earthquake, where Gremlin Jamface advises them to fix the disabled projectors via their control station in Rainbow Falls. They fight their way through Wasteland, fighting various Blotlings, Beetleworx and Blotworx. After heading to the Mad Doctor's lab in Disney Gulch and defeating a Blotworx dragon, they find out the projectors were intentionally sabotaged with evidence pointing to fellow gremlin, Prescott, who has been acting strangely. The group follows him to Fort Wasteland, an area that was seemly destroyed during the Blot's revolt, and help one of the Lonesome Ghosts befriend the local Blotlings, whom he believes are just misunderstood. They are then led to the Floatyard, where they find Prescott has built a massive robot designed after him, which he uses to attack the group. Destroying or trapping the robot, Mickey and Oswald try interrogating Prescott, only to have Animatronic Daisy Duck's news team and the Mad Doctor arrive. The Mad Doctor seems to put Prescott in a hypnotic trance, making him confess to being behind the chaos which convinces everyone except for the duo. The Mad Doctor later announces he will be building a new attraction as a victory celebration. The toons of Wasteland begin to accept him as their leader instead of Oswald, to the latter's dismay.

Concerned, Mickey and Oswald follow the Mad Doctor's trail through Ventureland to his hideout, which leads them through Autotopia, another area that was also supposedly destroyed during the Blot's revolt. While traveling through a projector leading to Lonesome Manor's attic, they learn what happened to the Mad Doctor after the events of the first game; he crash-landed in Disney Gulch and set up his new lab there. It is also revealed that he was the one who created the Blotworx (made from Spatters and cars from Autotopia), but was forced to cast them out due to their hostility. After saving a captured Jamface, they find the Mad Doctor's diary, from which they learn that he convinced Prescott to build him a special device to broadcast a show called The Mad Doctor's World of Evil into Mickey's world where its ratings there would bestow upon him a new heart, allowing him to leave Wasteland. He also manipulated Prescott into sabotaging the projectors to keep anyone from reaching Autotopia and discovering his scheme. Wanting to become a toon again after learning that he was falling apart due to his toon parts interfering with his animatronics, the Mad Doctor began using his technology to enslave the Guardians, the primeval spirits of Wasteland, which has been the cause of the earthquakes all along. They confront the Mad Doctor at his attraction, now revealed to be a doomsday device used to destroy Wasteland, where he demands the brush from Mickey in exchange for their friends whom he has kidnapped, but Oswald prevents this from happening as it will make him unstoppable. They defeat the Mad Doctor, whose robotic body finally gives out and is either defeated or redeemed depending on which path was taken in his fight. Afterwards, all of Wasteland celebrates Mickey and Oswald's triumph with a parade highlighting the duo's major choices throughout the game.

Meanwhile, the Petes of Wasteland (with Petetronic being present if the thinner path was taken) kidnap Prescott, presumably having plans for both him and Wasteland.

Gameplay
Like its predecessor, Epic Mickey 2 takes place in a world based on classic and retired Disney characters and attractions. Likewise, the gameplay in Epic Mickey 2 closely resembles that of the original. One of the biggest updates is the addition of Oswald as a supporting character for Mickey; Oswald can either be controlled by the computer or a second player. Oswald uses a remote control in a way similar to how Mickey uses his paintbrush, to attack (or befriend, in some cases) enemy characters and to power or reprogram machines as needed to complete tasks. Oswald also has many other abilities, such as flying with his ears, taking off his leg, using his arms as boomerangs, etc. There are also some special abilities that can only be used when Mickey and Oswald are working together. In the PlayStation 3 version of the game, players are able to use motion controls using the PlayStation Move controller.

Development
In August 2011, Destructoid posted an article that speculated that a sequel, Epic Mickey 2, was in development and showed possible box art for the game. These rumors were further encouraged when Disney France and Warren Spector invited the French media to an "epic project" taking place on March 27, 2012. Nintendo Power magazine also commented on the rumor, stating that their April 2012 issue would include a "top-secret" title preview, with the preview for the issue showing a cropped down picture of Oswald the Lucky Rabbit.

Game Trailers also stated that their March 22, 2012 episode would include a "world-exclusive preview of Warren Spector's new epic adventure" and that it would be "notably significant". Warren Spector himself also commented on the game's development, revealing that he had "a team of over 700 people working on the sequel". Following this, on March 20, 2012, the official French Nintendo magazine posted a comment on Twitter, revealing that Disney had plans to create a companion to the main sequel for the 3DS, under the name Epic Mickey: Power of Illusion.

Warren Spector officially confirmed the rumors, revealing the sequel's title to be Epic Mickey: Power of Two. Spector also directly addressed the camera issues that reviewers criticized in the first game, stating that "they'll be working on it until the day we ship the second game. (There have been) over 1,000 specific changes made to the camera. Our goal is that you will not have to touch the manual camera controls even once to play through the main story path of this game".

Spector also revealed that the game was to include voice acting and musical numbers, both of which were absent in the first game. Spector said: "I'm such a geek about musicals, I love the co-op and next-gen stuff, but for me, when a character breaks into song, which they do on a regular basis in this game, it's magic".

Spector also commented on the sequel's co-op features: "It's drop-in, drop-out co-op, you can sit down at any time with a friend who is playing as Mickey, and you can take control of Oswald. If you're playing as a single-player, Oswald will be there every second of the game. He's not just a multiplayer character, he's a helper, whether you're playing alone or with a friend or family member". Wasteland itself will feature old areas ruined by earthquakes and other natural disasters, as well as new areas such as Disney Gulch, based on Disneyland's Frontierland.

12 screenshots for the game were released in October 2012. Fans long speculated that the recently located Oswald cartoon Hungry Hobos (1928) would appear as an unlockable, but the final game included the Silly Symphony Skeleton Dance (1929) instead.

Epic Mickey 2: The Power of Two later received a port to Sony's PlayStation Vita platform. The Vita version was developed by Blitz Game Studios (in collaboration with Sony Computer Entertainment), which has already dealt with the PlayStation 3 and Xbox 360 version of the game. This version was optimized especially for the Vita and that the defects of the original version were placed, in particular the frame-rate and artificial intelligence. Vita version supports a co-op online or ad-hoc.

The previously canceled PC port of Epic Mickey 2 was given a limited release in Central European countries such as Poland and the Czech Republic in October 2013.

The game arrived in Japan exclusively on Nintendo's consoles (Wii and Wii U) on September 26, 2013. Nintendo 3DS sister title Power of Illusion (renamed as Mickey’s Marvelous Adventure) arrived with The Power of Two on the same day in Japan. Unlike the previous title Epic Mickey, Epic Mickey 2 was published by Spike Chunsoft in Japan.

Epic Mickey 2 was made available on Steam in October 2014. Xbox 360 version was added to the list of Xbox One Backwards Compatible titles in August 2017.

Reception

Epic Mickey 2: The Power of Two received mixed reviews, with most complaints being the game not fixing issues that were present in the original, as well as issues with Oswald's AI. Aggregating review websites GameRankings and Metacritic gave the Wii version 67.60% and 64/100, the Xbox 360 version 60.80% and 59/100 the PlayStation 3 version 57.83% and 59/100, the Wii U version 55.42% and 57/100, and the PlayStation Vita version 51.50% and 57/100.

Sales
Epic Mickey 2 was projected to sell over 2 million units worldwide. Despite heavy marketing and being released on several platforms, however, the game ultimately only sold 529,000 copies in the United States by the end of 2012, a quarter of what its predecessor sold. Following these financial losses, Disney made an official statement on January 29, 2013 that Junction Point Studios was to be closed in order to direct resources to other projects, with Warren Spector also stating that he was "in doubt" about the future of the series.

Cancelled sequel and spin-offs
Epic Mickey was envisioned as a three part story by Warren Spector, but a third Epic Mickey game was never announced, and developer Junction Point Studios was closed on January 29, 2013. Spector commented on the closure that "Disney just wanted to move in a different direction. Probably the right decision for them, frankly. No regrets. I had a great time working for Disney." Epic Mickey 2 was one of the last games to be published by Disney Interactive Studios before it closed in May 2016.

In 2016, concept art was leaked of a canceled kart racer based on the Epic Mickey franchise, named Epic Disney Racers, which was to include a number of other playable characters from Disney's legacy including Scrooge McDuck and Cruella de Vil, as well as Mickey and Oswald.

A cancelled spin-off starring Donald Duck, named Epic Donald was leaked in 2022 with the concept art.

References

External links
Official North American website

2012 video games
3D platform games
Action-adventure games
Crossover video games
Disney video games
Fantasy video games
Gamebryo games
Mickey Mouse video games
Multiplayer and single-player video games
Video games about parallel universes
PlayStation 3 games
PlayStation Move-compatible games
PlayStation Vita games
Post-apocalyptic video games
Steampunk video games
Video game sequels
Video games developed in the United Kingdom
Video games developed in the United States
Video games about rabbits and hares
Video games scored by James Dooley (composer)
Video games set in amusement parks
Wii games
Wii U games
Wii U eShop games
Windows games
Xbox 360 games
Epic Mickey
Video games using Havok
Video games directed by Warren Spector
Blitz Games Studios games
Video games with alternate endings